Wadsworth is an unincorporated community in Matagorda County, Texas, United States. According to the Handbook of Texas, the community had an estimated population of 180 in 2000.

Geography
Wadsworth is located at  (28.8324832, -95.9349598). It is situated at the junction of State Highway 60 and Farm Roads 521 and 2078 in south central Matagorda County, approximately eleven miles south of Bay City.

Climate
The climate in this area is characterized by hot, humid summers and generally mild to cool winters.  According to the Köppen Climate Classification system, Wadsworth has a humid subtropical climate, abbreviated "Cfa" on climate maps.

History
On October 11, 1902, Ambrose A. Plotner and John W. Stoddard purchased a tract of land known as the Kemp pasture. They formed the Colonial Land Company, which founded Wadsworth – named for William Wadsworth, an early settler in the area. The community became a stop on the Gulf, Colorado, and Santa Fe Railroad and a post office was established in 1907. The population was estimated at 150 in 1914. That figure had risen to nearly 925 in 1925. By the 1930s, Wadsworth had its own school district.

The community went into decline and by 1940, the population had fallen to 400. Wadsworth's school was consolidated with Bay City in 1949. In 1990, approximately 152 people lived in Wadsworth. By 2000, that number had risen slightly to 160.

Wadsworth has a post office with the ZIP code 77483. There are also two convenience stores in the community.

Education
Public education in the community of Wadsworth is provided by the Bay City Independent School District. Included Bay City High School, higher education is available at the Wharton County Junior College in Bay City, Texas.

Healthcare
Wadsworth and other municipalities in Matagorda County are served by the Matagorda Regional Medical Center.

As there are no doctors or hospitals in the community of Wadsworth for medical emergencies ambulances come from the nearby municipality of Bay City, Texas equipped with a trauma center that is not equipped to handle severe injuries. Living in Wadsworth for elder people can be dangerous because Bay City ambulances must travel 25 minutes to get to the Wadsworth community.

References

External links
 
 

Unincorporated communities in Texas
Unincorporated communities in Matagorda County, Texas